Imke Courtois (born 14 March 1988) is a Belgian former footballer who played as a defender. She works as a sports analyst. She played for the Belgium national team.

Playing career 
Courtois started her senior career at KFC Rapide Wezemaal in 2003. In 2008 she left Wezemaal for DVC Eva's Tienen. From 2010 she played for Standard Liège.

Media career 
Courtois is a football analyst for Sporza. She also played in the movie Loft, where she played the part of Sharon's friend.

In 2008 Courtois was also seen in the second series of Topmodel. She finished 9th out of 12 contestants.

Personal life 
Courtois is not related to Thibaut Courtois

Career statistics

Honours 
 8 times Belgian Champion
 3 times Belgian Women's Cup
 2 times BeNe Super Cup
 2 times Belgian Super Cup
 1 time Women's BeNe League
 1 time Double

References

External links
 

1988 births
Living people
Belgian women's footballers
Belgium women's international footballers
Women's association football defenders
Footballers from Flemish Brabant
Standard Liège (women) players
Sint-Truidense V.V. (women) players
Belgium women's youth international footballers
Sportspeople from Leuven
UEFA Women's Euro 2017 players